Palace Hotel Tokyo is a luxury hotel located in the Marunouchi business district of Tokyo, Japan. The hotel has 290 guestrooms and facilities, including 10 restaurants and bars, a spa, a fitness center, swimming pool and a business center.

Location
Palace Hotel Tokyo is located at 1-1-1 Marunouchi, across from the Ōte-mon Gate of the Imperial Palace in the Chiyoda ward in central Tokyo.

History
Palace Hotel Tokyo is owned by Palace Hotel Co. Ltd., a private consortium of shareholders first formed in 1961. The company’s founder and first president was Masatomo Yoshihara.

The new hotel succeeds two previous hotels, the Hotel Teito and Palace Hotel, which occupied the same site from 1947 and 1961 respectively. Each was razed to make way for its successor.

Construction of the original building that occupied the same location on which Palace Hotel Tokyo now stands was completed in December 1937 for use as the Forestry Office of the Imperial Household Agency. After World War II, on the order of the Supreme Commander for the Allied Powers, it was rebuilt for use as a hotel under government ownership and administration for the exclusive use of buying agents from abroad.
 
Hotel Teito’s land and building were sold to the private sector in 1959 and the hotel was demolished and rebuilt as the Palace Hotel, which opened for business on October 1, 1961. Palace Hotel was awarded the Architectural Industry Association Prize in 1963 for its success in blending modern architectural style with Japanese aesthetics.

In 2009, Palace Hotel closed for three years for demolition and rebuilding. The new building retains the shigaraki tiles that lined the original hotel’s exterior and the Chiyoda Suite's traditional ink wash painting, and also restored the original bar counter from Royal Bar.

Hotel

Spa & Fitness
Palace Hotel was the first hotel in Japan to have an Evian spa. The spa is located on the 5th floor, next to a fitness center and an indoor swimming pool with floor-to-ceiling windows looking out on to the Imperial Palace Plaza.

Restaurants & Bars
The hotel has 10 restaurants and bars offering both Japanese and international fare.

Additional facilities & amenities
The hotel also has facilities to host conventions and weddings. The 19th floor offers a club lounge.

Awards
 Travel Top 50 – 2012-2013 Monocle magazine UK.
 2013 World’s Greatest Hotels book – Travel + Leisure USA.
 Best Hotel with 100 Rooms or More – 2013 Travel + Leisure Design Awards USA.
 Forbes Travel Guide Five-Star Award  – Forbes Travel Guide Five-Star Award  USA.
 2015 Condé Nast Traveler USA Readers’ Choice Award  – Condé Nast Traveler USA.
 Hot List 2013: Best New Hotels with Great Food  – Condé Nast Traveler USA.

References

Hotels in Tokyo
Buildings and structures in Chiyoda, Tokyo
Fuyo Group
2012 establishments in Japan
Hotel buildings completed in 2012
Marunouchi